Hugh Grant (born 23 March 1958) is a Scottish business executive, who was the last CEO of Monsanto until its acquisition by Bayer.

Early life
Grant was born in Larkhall, Scotland. He received a bachelor's degree in agricultural zoology and molecular biology from the University of Glasgow, a postgraduate degree in agriculture from the University of Edinburgh, and an MBA from the International Management Centre in Buckingham, England.

Career
He worked in Scotland from 1981 to 1991 for the then US-based Monsanto company and then was appointed global strategy director in the agriculture division, based in St. Louis, Missouri. In 1995, he became managing director for the company's Asia-Pacific region and in 1998, co-president of the agriculture division.

The 20th-century Monsanto Company, in the midst of a roughly five-year series of mergers and spin-offs (which had the effect of reducing its focus on chemicals in favor of biotechnology), legally ceased to exist in 2000. A new Monsanto Company was created and Grant became executive vice president and chief operating officer of this new Monsanto. In 2003, he became president and chief executive officer and joined the board of directors.

In March 2009, Grant was named one of the world's 30 most respected CEOs on Barron's annual list.  He was named 2010 CEO of the Year by Chief Executive magazine. In 2009, Grant earned a total compensation of $10,803,757, which included a base salary of $1,391,356, a cash bonus of $1,070,382, stocks granted of $1,875,766, options granted of $5,902,039, and other compensation of $564,214.

He became a director of the Harris Distillery in 2014. In March 2018, Grant announced that after being acquired by Bayer, he would leave the company and he received a pay-off of approximately $77m post-sale.

References

External links

1958 births
Living people
Alumni of the University of Edinburgh
Alumni of the University of Glasgow
Businesspeople in agriculture
People from Larkhall
PPG Industries people
Scottish agronomists
Scottish chief executives
Scottish emigrants to the United States
Fellows of the American Academy of Arts and Sciences
Monsanto employees
American chief operating officers
American chief executives
American corporate directors
British corporate directors
American agronomists